The Collonges-Fort-l'Écluse – Divonne-les-Bains railway is a French railway line linking the Lyon-Geneva Railway from a junction near Collonges to Divonne-les-Bains. It crosses the whole of the region called the 'Pays de Gex' and is 38 km long. It used to continue through to  Nyon in Switzerland.

It is line number 891 000 of the French rail network.

History 
The line was opened 1 June 1899, and extended to Nyon in Switzerland in 1904. In the sixties, there were four services per day using 'Picasso' diesel railcars.  The last passenger train ran on 31 May 1980.  Since then, the passenger service has been replaced by a TER bus service from Bellegarde-sur-Valserine to Divonne-les-Bains. The only traffic on the line is a twice weekly household waste train from Chevry to the SIDEFAGE incinerator south of Bellegarde-sur-Valserine. Motive power for these trains was initially BB 67000 class diesel locomotives, but today they have been replaced by BB 75000s. Beyond Gex, the bridge over the Route nationale 5 has been dismantled, limiting traffic to Gex. The line is not operable beyond Chevry,

Use of the line for tourist trains has been mooted in the past. In May 2009, an association for the promotion of rail services in the Pays de Gex was formed to promote the inclusion of the line into the future Rhône Express Regional. There have been plans to reactivate the line for passenger traffic and to integrate it into the Geneva suburban rail system.

On April 28, 2014, it was announced that the line was to close for good.

Although the Nyon-Divonne line was private it was operated by CFF until 1962.  The service was replaced by a bus thereafter.

Gallery

References

Bibliography 
 Indicateur CHAIX summer 1967, page 563
 Connaissances du Rail no. 119, December 1990

External links 
 Promenade ferroviaire dans le Pays de Gex
 Photo essay in french by Thierry PERE with archive documents
  Historical details on the line on les-metiers-du-rail.eu 

Railway lines in Auvergne-Rhône-Alpes
Railway lines opened in 1899
Standard gauge railways in France